WIAN (1240 AM) was a radio station licensed to Ishpeming, Michigan. The station began broadcasting November 16, 1947, holding the call sign WJPD and operating with a 24 hour license of 1,000 watts daytime and 250 watts nightime. The station, whose slogan was "The Voice of the Iron Country," was licensed to Ishpeming Broadcasting Company. Its call sign stood for the founding owner's name, James P. Deegan. Locally, it was also referred to as "Where Joyful People Dwell".

The station's call sign was changed to WIAN on November 15, 1992. It changed formats from country, simulcasting 92.3 WJPD-FM, to adult contemporary, and began simulcasting AM 1320 WDMJ. In December 1998, WIAN and WDMJ adopted a talk/sports format. Its owner, Sovereign Communications, surrendered WIAN's license on July 30, 2020.

References

External links
Michiguide.com – WIAN History

IAN
Radio stations established in 1947
1947 establishments in Michigan
Defunct radio stations in the United States
Radio stations disestablished in 2020
2020 disestablishments in Michigan
IAN